Hot is a district (amphoe) in the southern part of Chiang Mai province in northern Thailand.

Geography
Neighboring districts are (from the north clockwise) Mae Chaem, Chom Thong of Chiang Mai Province, Ban Hong, Li  of Lamphun province, Doi Tao, Omkoi of Chiang Mai Province, Sop Moei and Mae Sariang of Mae Hong Son province.

The canyon of Op Luang National Park is in Hot District.

History
In 1905 the district Muet Ka was abolished and split into the district Mueang Hot and the minor district Mueang Hot. In 1917 the district was renamed Hot.

Administration
The district is divided into six sub-districts (tambon), which are further subdivided into 60 villages (muban). There are two sub-district municipalities (thesaban tambon), Tha Kham and Hang Dong, both covering parts of tambon Hang Don. There are a further six tambon administrative organizations (TAO).

Gallery

References

External links

amphoe.com (Thai)

Hot